Ivan Grbovic (born 1979 in Montreal, Quebec) is a Canadian cinematographer, film director and screenwriter, most noted for his film Drunken Birds (Les oiseaux ivres). The film was the top winner at the 24th Quebec Cinema Awards in 2022, including winning Best Film and garnering awards for Grbovic for Best Director and Best Screenplay, and was selected as the Canadian entry for the Best International Feature Film at the 94th Academy Awards.

He released his debut feature film Romeo Eleven (Roméo Onze) in 2011, for which he was a Jutra Award nominee for Best Director and Best Screenplay at the 15th Jutra Awards in 2013. He was also previously a Jutra nominee for Best Live Action Short Film at the 12th Jutra Awards in 2010 for La Chute, and a Prism Prize nominee in 2014 for his music video for Young Galaxy's "New Summer".

Filmography

Awards

References

External links

1979 births
Living people
21st-century Canadian screenwriters
21st-century Canadian male writers
Canadian male screenwriters
Canadian screenwriters in French
Canadian cinematographers
Canadian music video directors
Canadian people of Serbian descent
Film directors from Montreal
Writers from Montreal
Best Director Jutra and Iris Award winners